Thomas Dreßen (born 22 November 1993) is a German World Cup alpine ski racer. He specializes in the speed events of downhill and super-G. Dreßen made his World Cup debut in February 2015 at the Saalbach downhill. He made his first podium in December 2017 in the downhill at Beaver Creek and his first win came the following month at Kitzbühel.

Career
Dreßen made his World Cup debut at the Saalbach downhill on 21 February 2015; he finished in 39th place. He scored his first World Cup points in the Lake Louise downhill, finishing in 23rd.  In November 2018, Dreßen suffered a season-ending knee injury at Beaver Creek and missed the world championships in February. Exactly a year after his injury, he won the season's first downhill at Lake Louise.

World Cup results

Season standings

Race podiums
 5 wins – (5 DH)
 10 podiums – (7 DH, 3 SG)

World Championship results

Olympic results

References

External links
 
 

1993 births
Living people
Sportspeople from Garmisch-Partenkirchen
German male alpine skiers
Olympic alpine skiers of Germany
Alpine skiers at the 2018 Winter Olympics
21st-century German people